Ipela or Lilpela is a mountain pass through the Andes along the border between Chile and Argentina. It is most notable for being the pass used by Pablo Neruda to flee from Chile in 1949 due to the Cursed Law. The pass is not outfitted as an international border crossing. During summer months Carabineros guard the entrance to the pass close to Chabranco.

Mountain passes of Chile
Mountain passes of Argentina
Mountain passes of the Andes
Landforms of Los Ríos Region
Landforms of Neuquén Province
Argentina–Chile border crossings
Transport in Los Ríos Region